Ek Doctor Ki Maut is a 1990 Indian Hindi-language drama film by Tapan Sinha, which depicts the  ostracism, bureaucratic negligence, reprimand and insult of a doctor and his research, instead of recognition. The film is based on the story "Abhimanyu" by Ramapada Chowdhury. This movie is loosely based on the life of Dr. Subhash Mukhopadhyay, an Indian physician who pioneered the In vitro fertilisation treatment just around the same time when another leading scientist Dr. Robert Edwards was conducting separate experiments in England.

Plot
After years of painstaking research at the cost of his personal life, Dr. Dipankar Roy (Pankaj Kapur) discovers a vaccine for Leprosy. The news is flashed over television and overnight, an insignificant junior doctor receives international recognition. Professional jealousy and abuse of power threaten Dr. Roy,  even as the Secretary of Health reprimands him for breaking the news to the press. He is asked to report to the Director of Health. Professional colleagues Dr. Arijit Sen and Dr. Ramananda invite him to a lecture but, it is merely a pretense to humiliate him. Dr. Roy suffers a mild heart attack, but he refuses to go to the hospital. His wife (Shabana Azmi) and a few others like Dr. Kundu (Anil Chatterjee) and Amulya (Irfan Khan) stand by Dr. Roy, but the harassment continues; a letter from a British foundation, John Anderson Foundation, is suppressed and Dr. Roy is transferred to a remote village. The last straw is two American doctors receiving credit for discovering the same vaccine. Dr. Roy is shattered. However, in the end, Dr. Roy gets an invitation from the John Anderson Foundation inviting him to be a part of an eminent group of scientists working on other diseases. Dipankar Roy realizes that his research was fruitful. He also decides to accept the invitation as he just wants to work for the betterment of mankind.

Cast
 Pankaj Kapur as Dr. Dipankar Roy
 Shabana Azmi as Seema
 Anil Chatterjee as Dr. Kundu
 Irrfan Khan as Amulya
 Deepa Sahi
 Vijayendra Ghatge as Dr. Sen
 Sushant Sanyal
 Kaushal Kumar Singh

Reception 
The film was greatly applauded by film critics and writers. Tapan Sinha, the director, was inspired by the life and death of Subhash Mukhopadhyay and dedicates this film to him.

Awards

38th National Film Awards, India
 1990 National Film Award for Second Best Feature Film
 1990 National Film Award for Best Direction: Tapan Sinha
 1990 National Film Award - Special Jury Award: Pankaj Kapoor (Dr. Dipankar Roy).

Bengal Film Journalists' Association Awards
 1991 Best Film
 1991 Best Director

Filmfare Awards
 1992 Filmfare Best Screenplay Award: Tapan Sinha.

References

External links

1990s Hindi-language films
1990 films
Films based on short fiction
Films directed by Tapan Sinha
Films whose director won the Best Director National Film Award
Indian biographical films
Indian films based on actual events
Films scored by Vanraj Bhatia
Second Best Feature Film National Film Award winners
National Film Development Corporation of India films
Films based on works by Ramapada Chowdhury